The 2010–11 season is Al-Ahly S.C.'s 54th season in the Egyptian Premier League. Al-Ahly won its seventh title in a row. the third week of September was one of the most disappointing weeks for Al-Ahly where the club was eliminated from both CAF Champions League and The Egyptian Cup.

Squad

First team squad

Transfers
Players in / out

In

Out

Youth academy squad

Coaching staff

Matches

Egyptian Super Cup 2010
As the 2009–10 Egyptian Premier League champions, Al-ahly kicked off the 2009–10 season with the traditional match in the Egyptian Super Cup against 2010 Egypt Cup champion Haras El Hodood on 25 July 2010

Egyptian Premier League

First round

Results summary

Second round

Results summary

2011 CAF Champions League

Group B

Egypt Cup

First round

Round of 16

2010-11
Egyptian football clubs 2010–11 season